Aşağı Quşçu (also, Ashagy Kushchu, Ashagy-Kushchu-Kyrykly, and Ash-Kushchu) is a village and municipality in the Tovuz Rayon of Azerbaijan.  It has a population of 8,702.

References 

Populated places in Tovuz District